Trichostrongylidae is a family of nematode in the suborder Strongylida.

Genera
Genera:
 Africanastrongylus Hoberg, Abrams & Ezenwa, 2008
 Amidostomoides Petrova, 1987
 Arnfieldia Sarwar, 1957
 Ashworthius Le Roux, 1930
 Batrachostrongylus Yuen, 1963
 Biogastranema Rohrbacher & Ehrenford, 1954
 Camelostrongylus Orloff, 1933
 Chabaudstrongylus Durette-Desset & Denke, 1978
 Cnizostrongylus Chabaud, Durette-Desset & Houin, 1967
 Cooperia Ransom, 1907
 Durettestrongylus Guerrero, 1983
 Filarinema Mönnig, 1929
 Gazellostrongylus Yeh, 1956
 Graphidiella Olsen, 1948
 Graphidioides Cameron, 1923
 Graphidium Railliet & Henry, 1909
 Graphinema Guerrero & Rojas, 1969
 Haemonchus Cobb, 1898
 Hamulonema Hoberg & Abrams, 2008
 Heligosomoides
 Hexapapillostomum Lomakin, 1991
 Hoazinstrongylus Magalhães Pinto & Corrêa Gomes, 1985
 Hyostrongylus Hall, 1921
 Impalaia Mönnig, 1923
 Lagostonema Sutton & Durette-Desset, 1987
 Laurostrongylus Durette-Desset & Chabaud, 1992
 Libyostrongylus Lane, 1923
 Linustrongylus Vaucher & Durette-Desset, 1986
 Longistrongylus Le Roux, 1931
 Mainspinostrongyius Kalyankar & Palladwar, 1989
 Marshallagia Orloff, 1933
 Mecistocirrus Railliet & Henry, 1912
 Megacooperia Khalil & Gibbons, 1976
 Minutostrongylus Leroux, 1936
 Neocooperia Fotedar & Bambroo, 1971
 Nicollina Baylis, 1930
 Obeliscoides Graybill, 1924
 Ostertagia Ransom, 1907
 Paracooperia Travassos, 1935
 Paracooperioides Boomker, Horak & de Vos, 1981
 Paralibyostrongylus Ortlepp, 1939
 Paramidostomum Freitas & Mendonça, 1950
 Pararhabdonema Kreis, 1945
 Peramelistrongylus Mawson, 1960
 Profilarinema Durette-Desset & Beveridge, 1981
 Pseudostertagia Orloff, 1933
 Quasiamidostomum Lomakin, 1991
 Robustostrongylus Hoberg, Abrams & Pilitt, 2009
 Sahaynema Lakshmipyari & Gambhir, 2013
 Shikhobalovia Ali & Deshpande, 1969
 Spiculopteragia Orloff, 1933
 Teladorsagia Andreeva & Satubaldin, 1954
 Teporingonema Harris, 1985
 Travassosius Khalil, 1922
 Travassostrongylus Orloff, 1933
 Trichostrongyella Dikov, 1961
 Trichostrongylus Looss, 1905
 Websternema Vaucher & Durette-Desset, 1986

References

External links

 
Nematode families